Țerova may refer to the following places in Romania:
 Țerova, a tributary of the Bârzava in Caraș-Severin County
 Țerova, a tributary of the Gelug in Caraș-Severin County
 Țerova, a village in the municipality Reșița, Caraș-Severin County